Balder Tomasberg (1897, Paldiski – 1919, near Saint Petersburg) was an Estonian artist.

Tomasberg was born in Paldiski and moved to Tallinn in 1913. In 1915, he ended his art studies, and in early 1916 participated in an exhibition arranged by the Estonian Art Society. He was subsequently drafted into the Imperial Russian Army and sent to Novgorod to work as a decorator of stage sets for soldier theatres. He returned to Estonia in 1917 and together with his friend, sculptor Roman Haavamägi, a circle of artists called , which gathered several students of Ants Laikmaa, including Aleksander Mülber and Välko Tuul. The works of the group were exhibited together in the autumn of 1918, and Tomasberg contributed with several works with themes from the island of Pakri Islands, where the group had lived as an art colony. Later that year he volunteered to fight in the Estonian War of Independence and was mortally wounded in the fighting three months later.

His work consists of paintings made in pastels and watercolour, as well as graphic arts. The subject matter consists mostly of dream-like or fantastic landscapes.

References

External links

1897 births
1919 deaths
People from Paldiski
People from the Governorate of Estonia
20th-century Estonian painters
20th-century Estonian male artists
Russian military personnel of World War I
Estonian military personnel of the Estonian War of Independence
Estonian Academy of Arts alumni
Estonian military personnel killed in action